The American Journal of Health-System Pharmacy is a biweekly peer-reviewed medical journal covering all aspects of drug therapy and pharmacy practice specific to hospitals. It was established in 1943 and is published by the American Society of Health-System Pharmacists. The editor-in-chief is Daniel J. Cobaugh.

History
The journal was founded in 1943 as the Bulletin of the American Society of Hospital Pharmacists. It was renamed the American Journal of Hospital Pharmacy in 1958. Its sponsoring society launched a second journal, Clinical Pharmacy, in 1982; the two publications merged in 1994. In 1995 the AJHS obtained its present title.

Abstracting and indexing
The journal is abstracted and indexed in:

According to the Journal Citation Reports, the journal has a 2014 impact factor of 1.882.

References

External links

Pharmacy in the United States
Biweekly journals
Pharmacology journals
English-language journals
Publications established in 1943